G. W. Young may refer to:

 Geoffrey Winthrop Young (1876–1958), British climber, poet and educator
 G. W. Young (athlete), British track and field athlete who competed at the 1908 Summer Olympics in London